This is a list of Harlequin Romance novels released in 1982.

Releases

References 

Lists of Harlequin Romance novels
1982 novels